The 1960 United States Senate election in Virginia was held on November 8, 1960. Democratic incumbent Senator Absalom Willis Robertson defeated Independent Democrat Stuart Baker and Social Democrat Clarke Robb and was re-elected to a third term in office.

Results

References

External links
 1960 Senatorial General Election Results - Virginia Map by County at Dave Leip's US Election Atlas

Virginia
1960
1960 Virginia elections